Maximilian Drum (born 19 September 1991) is a German footballer who plays as a central defender for TSV Buchbach.

Career

Drum joined SpVgg Unterhaching from 1860 Munich in 2005 and came through the youth team, making his debut in a 6–0 win in the 3. Liga against Carl Zeiss Jena in August 2011, as a substitute for Michael Stegmayer. He established himself as a regular in the first-team in the second half of the 2011–12 season. He signed for Wacker Burghausen in July 2013 along with team-mate Stephan Thee. After Burghausen were relegated to the Regionalliga Bayern at the end of the 2013–14 season, Drum left the club, joining TSV Buchbach of the same division.

External links 
 

1991 births
Living people
Footballers from Munich
German footballers
Association football defenders
3. Liga players
SpVgg Unterhaching players
SV Wacker Burghausen players
SpVgg Unterhaching II players
TSV Buchbach players